Morgan–Monroe State Forest is a state forest in Morgan County and Monroe County of Indiana, and is the second largest state forest in Indiana.  The  comprising this deciduous forest was abandoned farmland, as the previous residents realized that the land's rocky soil was very poor for agricultural purposes.  In 1929 the state of Indiana purchased the land to prevent further erosion and to create the state forest.

Indiana's first Civilian Conservation Corps camp was in Morgan–Monroe State Forest in May 1933. The fire tower for the forest is no longer usable, but in 1999 was placed on the National Register of Historic Places.

An AmeriFLUX/FLUXNET tower, for the purpose of measuring water, carbon dioxide, and heat levels in a mixed hardwood ecosystem, is located within the forest.  This tower is maintained by Indiana University's Department of Geography.

Recreation activities include four hiking trails.  Hunting in the state forest is for deer, fox, ruffed grouse, raccoon, squirrel, and turkey.  Another highlight is the Draper Cabin, which is one hundred years old and may be rented overnight.

Cherry Lake is noted for its fishing. There are three lakes in the forest. One of the lakes, Beanblossum, is dry due to a dam failure in November 1993.

Morgan–Monroe State Forest, along with nearby Yellowwood State Forest, are among the very few places in Indiana where one can pan for gold, although a free permit is required first before doing any prospecting.

Indiana University's Morgan-Monroe Observatory is located in the Morgan–Monroe State Forest.

Notes

References
Kobrowski, Nicole Encyclopedia of Haunted Indiana 1st Ed.  
Indiana DNR page

Indiana state forests
Protected areas of Monroe County, Indiana
Protected areas of Morgan County, Indiana
Civilian Conservation Corps in Indiana
Protected areas established in 1929